Dane Hogan (born 3 July 1989) is an Australian professional rugby league footballer who plays as a  for the Sunshine Coast Falcons in the Queensland Cup (QRL).

Background
Hogan was born in Brisbane, Queensland, Australia

He played his junior rugby league for the Bribie Island Warrigals & Beachmere Pelicans where he won the Sunshine Coast competition U14 player of the year and represented the Australian Schoolboys at under-15s level and Queensland as an under-16. He moved to Sydney to sign professionally for the St George Dragons, before returning to Queensland to join the North Queensland Cowboys in 2008, where he was a member of the Under 20 team. He was named the youth team's player of the season in 2009 and made his first-grade début for the Cowboys the following season.

Playing career
Hogan made his NRL debut for the Cowboys in Round 9 of the 2010 season and went on to play 10 matches that season. In his last two seasons with the club Hogan failed to make another appearance for the North Queenslanders after an injury-plagued season in 2011. In 2012, despite showing consistent form in the QCup, Hogan failed to play a single match for the Cowboys, with Gavin Cooper, Glenn Hall, Dallas Johnson, Jason Taumalolo, Joel Reithmuller and Cory Paterson all ahead of him in the clubs pecking order for back-rowers.

In 2013, Hogan joined Queensland Cup outfit Easts Tigers.

References

1989 births
Rugby league players from Brisbane
North Queensland Cowboys players
Australian rugby league players
Rugby league locks
Northern Pride RLFC players
Rugby league props
Eastern Suburbs Tigers players
Living people
Sunshine Coast Falcons players